Akita Northern Gate Square (秋田ノーザンゲートスクエア) is an indoor basketball arena in Akita, Akita, Japan. Groundbreaking and construction began in 2018, and it was opened on December 17, 2019. It is located adjacent to the JR Akita Station, and the home practice arena of JR East Akita Peckers basketball. Featuring Akita cedar ceiling frameworks and glass walls, the three-storey building also houses the practice facility and team headquarters of the Akita Northern Happinets of the B.League.

Facilities
Two full-sized basketball courts - 1,400 sqm, four Sportsystem basketball rings and eight wall mounted goals
Happinets team store
Joto Sports Orthopaedic Clinic
Weight room (Bull weight lifting equipment)
Monitoring room 
NBA-style locker rooms
Running course
Sannoh Gakuen Nursery school

Gallery

References

2019 establishments in Japan
Akita Northern Happinets
Buildings and structures completed in 2019
Buildings and structures in Akita (city)
East Japan Railway Company
JR East Akita Peckers
Sports venues completed in 2019
Sports venues in Akita Prefecture
Indoor arenas in Japan
Basketball venues in Japan